The Ichnia Regiment was one the territorial-administrative subdivisions of the Cossack Hetmanate. The regiment's capital was the city of Ichnia, now in Chernihiv Oblast of northern Ukraine.

Regiment was raised by colonel Petro Holovatskyi in and around the town of Ichnia in January 1648, during Khmelnytsky Uprising. Shortly after Treaty of Zboriv, in October 1649, the regiment was disbanded. The regiment was reduced to 2 sotnias which were then transferred to Pryluky Regiment.

Commanders
All commanders were Colonels.
Petro Holovatskyi 1648-1649
Stepan Holovatskyi 1649

References

Sources 

Cossack Hetmanate Regiments
History of Chernihiv Oblast